This article lists events from the year 2017 in Uzbekistan

Incumbents 

 President: Shavkat Mirziyoyev
 Prime Minister: Abdulla Aripov

Events

September 
 September 16-17 - Nursultan Nazarbayev becomes the first foreign leader to visit President Mirziyoyev Tashkent.

December 
 December 22 - 2018 is declared the Year of Proactive Entrepreneurship, Innovative Ideas And Technologies by Shavkat Mirziyoyev.

References

 
2010s in Uzbekistan
Years of the 21st century in Uzbekistan